The Poumai people, also known as the Poumai Naga, are a Tibeto-Burman ethnic group inhabits the Northeast Indian states of Manipur and Nagaland. The Poumai predominantly live in the Senapati District of Manipur, though there are villages in Nagaland state and one in Ukhrul district .  The Poumai mainly live in 100 villages that have been broadly divided into three blocks: Paomata, Lepaona and Chilivai. The Poumai speak their own language, Poula, and are generally Christians.

References

External links 
https://web.archive.org/web/20140427005532/http://poumainaga.com/wiki/poumai-naga-tribe/
https://web.archive.org/web/20140427005529/http://poumainaga.com/wiki/poumaipedia/poumai-villages/
https://web.archive.org/web/20110825011032/http://poumai.wetpaint.com/page/Poumai+Naga
https://web.archive.org/web/20120328065058/http://classic.kanglaonline.com/index.php?template=kshow&kid=298&Idoc_Session=1b22ddd2873ef8925aed15a52b69a133

Naga people
Scheduled Tribes of Manipur
Ethnic groups in Northeast India